Flowers at the Scene is the fifth studio album by English singer-songwriter Tim Bowness. It was released on 1 March 2019 on Inside Out Music / Sony.

The album garnered extremely positive reviews from the Rock media in Britain and Europe, as well as in more mainstream publications such as The Daily Express, Mojo and Classic Pop.

Produced by Tim Bowness with Steven Wilson - as No-Man - and Brian Hulse, the album featured guest appearances from Peter Hammill, Kevin Godley, Andy Partridge, Jim Matheos, David Longdon, Colin Edwin, Dylan Howe and others.

Flowers At The Scene reached No.5 in both the official UK Rock and UK Progressive charts, No.24 in the official UK Vinyl chart, No.38 in the official UK Physical sales chart, and No.65 in the official Scottish albums chart.

Track listing

Chart Positions

References

2019 albums
Tim Bowness albums
Inside Out Music albums